Guglielmo Bruno (born 28 August 1985), known professionally as Willie Peyote, is an Italian rapper and singer-songwriter.

His stage name is a pun on the cartoon character Wile E. Coyote and the peyote.

He participated at the Sanremo Music Festival 2021 with the song "Mai dire mai (La locura)", winning the Mia Martini critics award.

Discography

Studio albums 
 Manuale del giovane nichilista (2011)
 Non è il mio genere, il genere umano (2014)
 Educazione sabauda (2015)
 Sindrome di Tôret (2017)
 Iodegradabile (2019)
 Pornostalgia (2022) – No. 5 Italy

Live albums 
 Ostensione della sindrome - Ultima cena (2019)

References

Italian rappers
Italian  male singer-songwriters
Living people
21st-century Italian male  singers
1985 births
Musicians from Turin